Lars Zebroski (January 12, 1941 – January 10, 1998) was an American cyclist. He competed in the individual road race at the 1960 Summer Olympics.

References

External links
 

1941 births
1998 deaths
American male cyclists
Olympic cyclists of the United States
Cyclists at the 1960 Summer Olympics
People from Culver City, California
Cyclists from California